Michael Handelsman is an American specialist in Spanish language and of Latin American literature and Latin American studies, currently a Distinguished Humanities Professor at the University of Tennessee.

References

Year of birth missing (living people)
Living people
University of Tennessee faculty
University of Florida alumni
Gettysburg College alumni
21st-century American historians
21st-century American male writers
American male non-fiction writers